is a Japanese Noh play from the 15th century, by Hiyoshi Sa-ami Yasukiyo.

Theme
The play centres around the encounter between the giant warrior monk Benkei and the youthful Minamoto no Yoshitsune, in which the slighter, younger man defeated the elder. The hand-to-hand bridge combat forged a lasting bond between the pair.

Thereafter Benkei served as Yoshitsune’s second in command - as what Basho would describe as “his faithful retainer, Benkei”.

Later developments
Buson created a haiku and a haiku painting, Benkei and Young Bull, around the themes of the play, quoting from it in his haiku:

“Snow, moon, and blossoms -

And then a pledge for three lives,

Faith and loyalty”.

See also

References

External links
The Noh Plays of Japan: Chapter II: Benkei on the Bridge

Noh plays
Japanese warrior monks
Plays set in the 12th century